Rantau Panjang (Jawi: رنتاو ڤنجڠ) 
(Thai: รันเตาปันจัง) is a district (subdistrict/commune) and also a parliamentary constituency in Pasir Mas District, Kelantan, Malaysia.

Geography
Rantau Panjang is located near the Malaysia-Thailand Border. Across the border is Su-ngai Kolok, Thailand. It has a population of 19,054 people.

Administrative divisions
 Bakat
 Gual Nering
 Lubok Gong
 Lubok Setol
 Rahmat
 Rantau Panjang
 Telaga Mas

References

External links
Google Maps link of Rantau Panjang (to the right of the Golok River) and Su-ngai Kolok town in Thailand to the left of the river.

Pasir Mas District
Populated places in Kelantan
Malaysia–Thailand border crossings